was a Japanese botanist and an expert in plant ecology who specialized in seeds and natural forests. He was active worldwide as a specialist in natural vegetation restoration of degraded land.

He was professor emeritus at Yokohama National University and director of the Japanese Center for International Studies in Ecology since 1993. He received the Blue Planet Prize in 2006.

Thesis
Beginning in the 1970s, Miyawaki advocated for the restoration of natural forests. In 1992, he said he believed that the Earth Summit in Rio de Janeiro failed to emphasize the protection of native forests, most of which continued to decline.

Miyawaki observed trees that traditionally grew around temples, shrines, and cemeteries in Japan, such as the Japanese blue oak, Castanopsis cuspidata, bamboo-leaf oak, Japanese chestnut trees, and Machilus thunbergii. He believed that they were relicts of the primary forest. Meanwhile, he noted that trees such as Japanese cedar, cypress and larch pine, supposedly native to Japan, had been introduced into Japan over centuries by foresters to produce timber. Miyawaki reflected on the consequences of the change in composition and structure of most Japanese forests, most of which do not contain solely their original natural vegetation.

He calculated that only 0.06% of contemporary Japanese forests were indigenous forests. Contemporary forests, created according to forestry principles, in his opinion, are neither the most suitable candidates to address climate change nor the most resilient vegetation for the geo-bioclimatic conditions of Japan.

Using the concept of potential natural vegetation, Miyawaki developed, tested, and refined a method of ecological engineering today known as the Miyawaki method to restore native forests from seeds of native trees on very degraded soils that were deforested and without humus. With the results of his experiments, he restored protective forests in over 1,300 sites in Japan and various tropical countries, in particular in the Pacific region in the form of shelterbelts, woodlands, and woodlots, including urban, port, and industrial areas. Miyawaki demonstrated that rapid restoration of forest cover and soil was possible by using a selection of pioneer and secondary indigenous species that were densely planted and provided with mycorrhiza.

Miyawaki studied local plant ecology and used species that have key and complementary roles in the normal tree community.

Curriculum
Miyawaki was primarily a botanist who specialized in plant ecology and seeds, who wrote a thesis on the subject in the Department of Biology at the University of Hiroshima. He conducted field research in various parts of Japan while working as a research assistant at the Yokohama National University, and continued his studies at the University of Tokyo.

Reinhold Tüxen (1899–1980), who headed the Federal Institute for Vegetation Mapping, invited him to Germany. Miyawaki worked with him on potential natural vegetation from 1956 to 1958.

Miyawaki returned to Japan in 1960 and applied the methods of mapping potential natural vegetation. He found relicts of ancient forests still present in the vicinity of temples and shrines (surrounding sacred groves). He inventoried over 10,000 sites throughout Japan, and was able to identify potential flora affected by different types of human activity, including in mountainous areas, riverbanks, rural villages, and urban areas.

From the data collected, he created maps of existing vegetation and maps of potential natural vegetation. His maps are still used as a basis for scientific research and impact studies, and as a tool for land use, diagnosis and for mapping biological corridors. These maps of potential natural vegetation serve as a model to restore degraded habitats and native plant environments.

From 1980 to 1990, in cooperation with laboratories of phytoecology and universities, Miyawaki led botanical and phytosociological inventories to map vegetation throughout Japan, compiled into a ten-volume, 6,000-page study.

Origin of the "Miyawaki method"
Miyawaki concluded that a natural Japanese temperate forest should be mainly composed of deciduous trees, while in practice conifers often dominate. Deciduous trees are still present around tombs and temples, where religious and cultural influences have protected them from exploitation.

Miyawaki found that the current forest vegetation of Japan (24.1 million hectares, or 3.5 billion cubic meters of timber on more than 64% of the country) had moved away from potential natural vegetation due to introduced species. He noted that conifers, which became dominant in many forests, are actually an introduced species and were naturally present only at high altitudes and extreme environments, such as mountain ridges and steep slopes. They had been planted there for centuries to produce more timber, and they acclimatized.

First experiments
Miyawaki's first field trials showed that planted forests, which in composition and structure were closer to what would exist in the absence of human activity, grew quickly and generally showed good ecological resilience. He created a large seed bank (more than 10 million seeds have been identified and classified, according to their geographical origin and soil). The seeds are mostly from remnants of natural forests preserved for generations around temples and cemeteries because of the traditional belief in Chinju no Mori; it was considered unlucky to interfere with these forests. These places have allowed the preservation of thousands of small reserves of native species and tree genes descending from prehistoric forests.

Miyawaki used the principles of this tradition, and proposed a plan to restore native forests for environmental protection, water retention, and protection against natural hazards. His proposals were not initially met with positive feedback, but in the early 1970s, Nippon Steel Corporation, which wanted to plant forests on embankments around its steelworks at Oita, became interested in his work after the death of previous conventional plantations and entrusted him with a first operation.

Miyawaki identified the potential natural vegetation of the area, and studied the forests surrounding two nearby tombs (Usa and Yusuhara). He chose various species of trees that he tested on the substrate to be afforested, and created a nursery where plants were mixed and then planted on the site. The steel corporation was satisfied with the results, and planted forests at its steel mills in Nagoya, Sakai, Kamaishi, Futtu, Hikari, Muroran, and Yawata.

Since then, Miyawaki and his colleagues and partners have covered more than 1,300 sites with multilayered protective forests composed entirely of native species. The method has been tested successfully in almost all of Japan, sometimes on difficult substrates, including plantations to mitigate the effects of tsunamis on the coast, or typhoons in the port of Yokohama, wastelands, artificial islands, fixing crumbling slopes after road construction, and creating a forest on a cliff freshly cut with dynamite to construct the Monju Nuclear Power Plant in Fukui Prefecture.

International applications
Miyawaki instructed people on planting in over 1,700 areas around the world, including over 1,400 sites in Japan as well as in Borneo, Amazonia, and China. He was involved in the planting of over 40 million native trees, together with companies and citizens, to contribute to international forest regeneration. Since 1978, Miyawaki had contributed to vegetation surveys in Thailand, Indonesia, and Malaysia.

His methodological work in the 1970s and 1980s on woodland management also formed the basis for the concept of "tiny forests", where small urban plots of land around the world can be densely planted with many different local species of trees to reintroduce varied wooded habitats that are rich in biodiversity.

Malaysia
In 1990, Miyawaki worked on restoring severely degraded tropical forests. A seed bank of 201 tree species (mainly Dipterocarpaceae) from potential natural vegetation produced 600,000 seedlings in pots that were annually planted on site was provided by sponsors. In 2005, the surviving plants from 1991 measured over 20 meters in height. The sedimentary facies of a young rainforest was reconstituting, protecting the soil, while fauna gradually reappeared.

Italy
In 2000, the Miyawaki method was tested for the first time in a Mediterranean ecosystem in Sardinia, Italy, on an area where traditional reforestation methods had failed. The original method was adapted while maintaining its theoretical principles. The results obtained after two and eleven years following planting were positive: plant biodiversity was high, and the new biocoenosis was able to improve without further operative support. On the other hand, between 61% and 84% of the newly planted trees had died after a period of twelve years.

France
In 2018, the Miyawaki method was implemented by the boomforest.org team in Paris, France, to restore a 400-square meter area near Porte de Montreuil, in the Boulevard Périphérique, a controlled-access dual-carriageway ring road around the city. In 2021, a 180-square meter area that used to be a parking lot in a residential district near Bordeaux's Saint-Jean railway station was converted into the city's first mini-forest.

India
In 2013, the Miyawaki method was applied in the Barapani Industrial Area of Umiam in northeast India.

In 2014, SayTrees in Bangalore switched to the Miyawaki method.

Acacia Eco, based in Ahmedabad, Gujarat, has been implementing projects of various sizes using the Miyawaki method since 2016. As of November 2020, they have planted more than 350,000 trees in 57 projects across India.

In 2019, GreenYatra planted around 3,000 trees using the Miyawaki method on CRWC railway land in Jogeshwari, Mumbai. GreenYatra planted 1,000,000 more trees within one year throughout India by using the method.

On 5 June 2019, World Environment Day, 600 saplings of native species were planted in My Lady's Garden, Chennai near Central Railway Station by  Indian Oil Corporation Limited under Corporate Social Responsibility (CSR).

On 5 June 2019, World Environment Day, 550 trees of 40 native species were planted with this technique in a 160-square meter plot. The forest was named after Guru Nanak Dev, the founder of the Sikh religion.

Since that same date, the Anarghyaa Foundation has created Miyawaki forests in rural areas of North Bangalore. The Anarghyaa Foundation will be creating mini-forests by planting lakh trees with the Miywaki method across Karnataka within the next year {which year?}.

In December 2019, the Annapradokshana Charitable Trust turned unused space in government schools into mini-forests by adopting the Miyawaki system at the Nonankuppam Government Higher Secondary School and the Vivekananda Government Boys Higher Secondary School in Villianur, Pondicherry.

In Feb 2022, 2000 saplings were planted under "Lungs of Ghaziabad" programme, using Miyawaki method, by Indian Oil Corporation Limited (IndianOil) under Corporate Social Responsibility (CSR) in association with Ghaziabad Nagar Nigam.

In June 2022, around 1500 saplings, of near about 100 native species were planted with this technique in a narrow area of just 2 meter width  and near about 300 meter long at Anant Tuljaram Vidyalaya Nalegaon school located in Latur district of Maharashtra state. This school seems to be first school in the country to have plantation by this method in their school premises.

United Kingdom
In the United Kingdom, Miyawaki's "tiny forest" method was adopted by the environmental charity Earthwatch Europe with the aim to develop a hundred urban projects nationwide by 2023.

United States
Cambridge, Massachusetts has two Miyawaki forests. The Cambridge Department of Public Works, in partnership with Biodiversity for a Livable Climate and Natural Urban Forests, planted the first one in Danehy Park in September 2021. It was the first of its kind in the northeastern United States. Cambridge's second Miyawaki forest was planted in November 2022 in Greene-Rose Heritage Park. It was a collaboration between Cambridge Department of Public Works, Biodiversity for a Livable Climate, and Cambridge Participatory Budgeting.

Sri Lanka
In Sri Lanka, the Thuru Team commenced a pilot urban forestry project using the Miyawaki method in 2021, planting 44 plants endemic to Sri Lanka.

Pakistan
In January 2021, Masood Lohar, a former UNDP officer, created the Clifton Urban Forest in Karachi, a private initiative operating over 200 acres on a coastline landfill site and following Miyawaki's techniques. In November, Karachi municipality announced a plan for growing 300 Miyawaki forests.

In June 2021, Park Avenue Housing Society, a private residential society in Lahore inaugurated world's biggest private urban forest using the Miyawaki method spread over 80 kanal land.

In August 2021, Imran Khan, Prime Minister of Pakistan,  inaugurated the largest urban Miyawaki forest project in the world at Saggian. Using a technique pioneered by the late Japanese botanist Akira Miyawaki, the forest covers 12.5 acres and has more than 165,000 plants.

Method and conditions for success

The method's reconstitution of "indigenous forests by indigenous trees" produces rich, dense and efficient protective pioneer forests in 20 to 30 years, where natural succession would need 200 years in temperate Japan and 300 to 500 years in the tropics. Success requires compliance with the following phases:

Rigorous initial site survey and research of potential natural vegetation
Identification and collection of a large number of various native seeds, locally or nearby and in a comparable geo-climatic context
Germination in a nursery (which requires additional maintenance for some species; for example, those that germinate only after passing through the digestive tract of a certain animal, need a particular symbiotic fungus, or a cold induced dorming phase)
Preparation of the substrate if it is very degraded, such as the addition of organic matter or mulch, and, in areas with heavy or torrential rainfall, planting mounds for taproot species that require a well-drained soil surface. Hill slopes can be planted with more ubiquitous surface roots species, such as cedar, Japanese cypress, and pine.
Plantations respecting biodiversity inspired by the model of the natural forest. A dense plantation of very young seedlings (but with an already mature root system: with symbiotic bacteria and fungi present) is recommended. Density aims at stirring competition between species and the onset of phytosociological relations close to what would happen in nature (three to five plants per square metre in the temperate zone, up to five or ten seedlings per square metre in Borneo).
Plantations randomly distributed in space in the way plants are distributed in a clearing or at the edge of the natural forest, not in rows or staggered

Results
According to the classical theory of succession initiated by Frederic Clements in the U.S., a young native forest with a multi-layered community would need 150 to 200 years to restore itself on bare soil in Japan, and it would take at least 300 years to do the same in the tropics of Southeast Asia.

Miyawaki extensively tested the method in deforested sites in dry tropical zones in Thailand, alluvial tropical forests in the Brazilian Amazon, and the old Nothofagus forest area in Concepción, Chile.

In 1998, Miyawaki piloted a reforestation program dominated by Quercus mongolica along the Great Wall of China, and gathered 4,000 people to plant 400,000 trees, with the support of the Aeon Environment Foundation and the city of Beijing. The first trees planted by groups of Chinese and Japanese, on areas where the forest had long since gone, grew over 3 m high in 2004 and – except for one part – continued to thrive in 2007.

Miyawaki also contributed to the massive reforestation in China by its government and Chinese citizens in Pudong, Qingdao, Ningbo, and Ma'anshan.

Miyawaki received the 2006 Blue Planet Award for environmental conservation.

His method was deemed exemplary in a preparatory report for the 1992 Earth Summit, and in 1994 in the biodiversity congress of the UNESCO in Paris. The method was also presented in 1991 at the Symposium of the University of Bonn, and at the congresses of the International Association for Ecology, the International Society for Vegetation Science, and the International Botanical Congress, which included new aspects such as the links between growth, natural habitat, and estimated carbon fixation.

Criticism
One of the criticisms against the Miyawaki method is that it produces a slightly monotonous visual appearance due to the first generation of trees all being the same age. This criticism is generally made based on photographs taken after 10 or 20 years. Miyawaki wanted to imitate the complexity and the semi-random nature of the plant community of the native habitat, and promoted plant competition, natural selection, and plant associations. He believed that the faster-growing trees, the broken ones, and those attacked by herbivores quickly produce new shoots that result in low and intermediate strata.

Another criticism is the high cost of the first phase (nursery, soil preparation, dense planting). Some have lost most of their leaves in cyclones, but they resisted and helped protect the buildings where they were planted.

Biography 

 1928: Born 29 January in Okayama
 1952: Diploma in biology, Hiroshima University
 1958–1960: Visiting researcher under Reinhold Tüxen in Stolzenau, Germany
 1961: Doctor of Science, Hiroshima University
 1961–1962: Researcher at Yokohama National University
 1962–1973: Associate Professor at Yokohama National University
 1973–1993: Founding professor of the Institute of Environmental Science and Technology at Yokohama National University
 1985–1993: Director of the Institute of Environmental Science and Technology at Yokohama National University
 1993–: Professor Emeritus of Yokohama National University
 1993–: Director of the Japanese Center for International Studies in Ecology
He was an honorary member of the International Association for Vegetation Science (1997).

Publications

In English
Miyawaki A (1992). Restoration of Evergreen Broad-leaved Forests in the Pacific Region. In: M.K. Wali (ed.). Ecosystem Rehabilitation. 2. Ecosystem Analysis and synthesis. SPB Academic Publishing, The Hague
Miyawaki A, K. Fujiwara & E.O. Box (1987). Toward harmonious green urban environments in Japan and other countries. Bull. Inst. Environ. Sci. Technol.. Yokohama Natl. Univ. 14: Yokohama.
Miyawaki A & S. Okuda (1991). Vegetation of Japan Illustrated. Shibundo, Tokyo (Japanese)
Miyawaki A et al. (1983). Handbook of Japanese Vegetation, Shibundo, Tokyo
Miyawaki A (1980-1989). Vegetation of Japan. vol. 1-10
Miyawaki A (1985). Vegetation-Ecological Studies on Mangrove Forests in Thailand,  Inst. Environ. Sci. Technol. Yokohama Natl. Univ., Yokohama
Miyawaki A, Bogenrider, S. Okuda & I. White (1987). Vegetation Ecology and Creation of New Environments. Proceedings of International Symp. in Tokyo and Phytogeographical Excursion through Central Japan. Tokai Univ. Press, Tokyo
Miyawaki A, & E. O. Box (1996). The Healing Power of Forests -The Philosophy behind Restoring Earth's Balance with Native Trees. 286 p. Kosei Publishing Co. Tokyo
Miyawaki A, Plants and Human (NHK Books)
Miyawaki A, The Last Day for Man (Chikuma Shobo)
Miyawaki A, Testimony by Green Plants (Tokyo Shoseki)
Miyawaki A, Prescription for Restoration of Green Environments (Asahi Shinbun-sha)
Miyawaki A, Chinju-no-mori (Native Forests of Native Trees) (Shincho-sha).

In Japanese
 日本植生誌, edition 至文堂, 2000, .
 植物と人間, editions NHK
 緑回復の処方箋
 鎮守の森, Shinshio Journal (新潮)
 いのちを守るドングリの森

References

External links 

 Biography on Japanese Center for International Studies in Ecology
 Yokohama Rubber Co. page on Yokohama Forever Forest project

20th-century Japanese botanists
1928 births
2021 deaths
Hiroshima University alumni
People from Kurashiki
Academic staff of Yokohama National University
Recipients of the Medal with Purple Ribbon
21st-century Japanese botanists